Incudine is a town and comune in the province of Brescia, in Lombardy, northern Italy.

Monuments and attractions

Religious architecture 
The churches in Incudine are:

 San Maurizio Church, built in the 16th century with the tower bell dating back to the 18th century. The building was expanded at the beginning of the 20th century.
 San Bernardino Church, located in Vago; it dates back to the 17th century.
 San Vito e Sant'Anna, located at the bottom of San Vito peak at 1860m. Its dimensions are relevant to the environmental context in which it is situated.

References 

Cities and towns in Lombardy